John Guy Wilson (1842–1892) was a Manchester, UK patent agent and the founder of Wilson Gunn, one of the oldest firms of Patent and Trade Mark Attorneys in the UK. As a side line he acted as agent to the Alliance Insurance Company. There is no record that Mr. Wilson ever became a member of the Chartered Institute of Patent Agents.

An extract from a Manchester trade journal of the time is shown below:

Mr. John G. Wilson, Practical Mechanical Engineer, Draughtsman, and Patent Agent, 55 Market Street – To the inventor and man of genius labouring to bring out some important creation of his own ingenuity, there is no more important institution than the Patent Office and Registry of Designs, where he can protect and make secure the results of his labours. At the offices of Mr. John G. Wilson is established the British and Foreign Patent Office, Trade Marks and Designs Registry. Mr. Wilson, having had twenty-five years' experience in this business, is able to decide or advise upon the practical utility or otherwise of any invention, thus saving intending patentees an immense amount of time and money. As a practical mechanical engineer, Mr. John G. Wilson enjoys a high reputation in this city, and has a large practice. The business of his firm in connection with British and foreign patents extends to all parts of the world. He has had a long and honourable connection with this city, and possesses the esteem and confidence of a very extensive and valuable connection.

Office locations in Manchester
John Guy Wilson opened his first office in 1864 at No. 109 Market Street, Manchester, and after a few months moved to No. 24 Market Place, Manchester, where he practised as Patent Agent, Practical and Mechanical Engineer, and Draughtsman, under the title of John G. Wilson & Co.

References

External links
Wilson Gunn Patent and Trade Mark Attorneys

Patent attorneys
Businesspeople from Manchester
1892 deaths
1842 births
19th-century English businesspeople